Lajja Goswami (born 28 September 1988) is an Indian markswoman and policewoman. She is a former National Cadet Corps (NCC) cadet. She won the conferred Raksha Mantri Medal in 2009. She also won the silver medal in women's 50-metre rifle 3 position event, at ISSF World Cup in Granada, Spain (2013). She is a brand ambassador for Gujarat State and became the first sportswoman to be appointed as a police inspector in the Gujarat Police cadre in the sports quota.

She has also participated in Asian Games 2014 and finished in Top 8. Since her childhood Lajja was interested in rifles and guns. While other children were playing with dolls and toys, Lajja played with guns. Thus she was different from other children. 

Initially Lajja showed her talent in shooting as an NCC cadet. Then to sharpen the edge of her performance, she took coaching from Indian shooting academy,pune and the coach sunny Thomas trained her in shooting.

Personal life
She hails from Jitodia, a small village located in Anand district of Gujarat. Lajja's father, Tilak Giri Goswami, is a care taker of an ancient Shiv temple named Baijanath Mahadev in Jitodia village. She lived in a small family of four members only her father, mother and a brother.

Early childhood
Lajja's was a middle-class family. Tilak Giri, her father told media that while other children were playing with dolls and toys, Lajja played with guns. Her talent in shooting became focused when she got enrolled to the NCC as a cadet. She got training for shooting from coach, Sunny Thomas in Pune.

Achievements and medals

References

Living people
Commonwealth Games bronze medallists for India
Indian female sport shooters
Shooters at the 2010 Commonwealth Games
Sportswomen from Gujarat
People from Anand district
Shooters at the 2010 Asian Games
Shooters at the 2014 Asian Games
1988 births
Commonwealth Games medallists in shooting
21st-century Indian women
21st-century Indian people
Sportspeople from Gujarat
Asian Games competitors for India
Medallists at the 2010 Commonwealth Games
Medallists at the 2014 Commonwealth Games